The 2018 Tibor Zsíros Férfi Magyar Kupa was the 61st season of the Hungarian Basketball Cup. Szolnoki Olaj won its 7th national Cup championship. Dávid Vojvoda was named Most Valuable Player.

Qualification
Eight highest ranked teams after the first half of the 2017–18 NB I/A regular season qualified to the tournament.

Szolnoki Olaj KK
Egis Körmend
Alba Fehérvár
Falco-Vulcano Energia KC Szombathely
Atomerőmű SE
KTE-Duna Aszfalt
Pécsi VSK-VEOLIA
Zalakerámia ZTE KK

Bracket

Matches

Quarterfinals

Semifinals

Bronze medal match

Final

See also
 2017–18 Nemzeti Bajnokság I/A

References

External links
 Official website
 Hungarian Basketball Federaration
 bb1.hu

Magyar Kupa men